Golden Faith is a 2002 Hong Kong television drama produced by TVB, starring Gallen Lo, Deric Wan, Jessica Hsuan, Raymond Lam, Anne Heung, Myolie Wu, Tavia Yeung, Michelle Ye, Paul Chun, Lau Dan, Shek Sau, Kwok Fung, Lau Kong, and Gigi Wong. It was Gallen Lo's final performance in a dramatic epic before leaving TVB, Deric Wan's comeback role, Myolie Wu's breakthrough, and Felix Lok's first major role. It was billed as "a major production from the makers of At the Threshold of an Era".

Synopsis
Ivan Ting Sin-boon (Gallen Lo) is orphaned at young age and was adopted by Ting Wing-pong (Paul Chun), the CEO of Gold Smith Group, a jeweller in Hong Kong. His real name is Chung Tin-yan and his family died in a ship wreck when he was a child coming to Hong Kong. Ivan grew up knowing the business ethics his father went through as he built his empire, which included smuggling and money laundering, but never got involved in the operations himself. No one knows of his true identity, not even his adopted mother and siblings.

On a trip to Perth, Australia, he meets Rachel Ching Tin-lam (Jessica Hsuan). After a few incidents, they are brought together. As they are about to begin a relationship together, Ivan is called back to Hong Kong due to one of his father's old business partners requesting help. During this incident, he gets into trouble with the law; he crosses paths with an undercover police officer, Chung Sau-hong (Deric Wan) who is out to put an end to their illegal operations. Ivan is soon arrested for what seems like an illegal transaction between himself and his father's old partner but in reality he simply gives money without actually taking the "goods". When he faces his case in court, the prosecutor is none other than Rachel. After clearing the misunderstandings, he manages to embark on a relationship with her.

However, in the middle of their relationship, Ivan is faced with more and more crises. On one hand, he believes he killed Law Kai-cheung (Kwok Fung) while trying to save his sister, Yan (Myolie Wu). On the other, he is constantly helping his family avoid legal prosecution due to their past. This puts a strain on their relationship.

Ivan's good friend, Sabrina Kwai Lai-fu (Anne Heung), who loves Ivan with all her heart, is constantly tormented by Jonathan Hung Pak-to (Shek Sau), his rival business partner. Jonathan steals a precious crown meant from Gold Smith and she is forced to make a sacrifice of sleeping with him to get it back. Eventually, Jonathan pushes her too far and she kills him. As a result, Ivan decides to fully give up his relationship with Rachel because of obligation to Sabrina.

When his father dies, he is left with a majority of the family fortune and is the principal stakeholder, making him CEO and Chair of Gold Smith. This upsets his second-uncle greatly. His younger brother Oscar, who studied in America, comes back to help in the family business despite initially hesitating and preferring to pursue a career in marine biology. 

Oscar accidentally hits someone with his car one day and their second uncle uses this incident to twist Oscar's mind into hating Ivan, initiating a power struggle between the two brothers that will lead to Ivan's true identity being revealed. Oscar is not pleased that a non-Ting member holds the ruling power in the company. Ivan agrees to allow Oscar to be the new CEO with a few stipulations.

Their second uncle continues to scheme, attempting to revert the company back into the money laundering scheme it used to be. Eventually Rachel goes out with Hong and he is revealed to be Ivan's younger brother who was thought to have died at sea. Sabrina leaves Ivan due to being constantly reminded of her time with Pak-to. Soon after, Ivan and Hong reconcile, leading to Ivan and Rachel's increased interaction once again. She starts to understand his complex life and realizes why he made the choices he made and how it burdens him so. Ivan's personality makes her realize who she truly loved and she reconsiders her relationship with Hong. Meanwhile, Oscar is driven further and further down the wrong path by their second uncle.

Eventually, Oscar realizes the error of his ways and Ivan regains control of Gold Smith, exposing their second uncle. Once he realizes his late-father's dream for the company, he is free to pursue his relation with Rachel once again. In the end, Ivan and Rachel live happily ever after in Perth.

Cast

Main cast
Gallen Lo as Ivan Ting 
Deric Wan as Chung Sau-hong
Jessica Hsuan as Rachel Ching
Raymond Lam as Oscar Ting
Myolie Wu as Ting Sin-yan
Michelle Ye as Rain Ching
Tavia Yeung as Kiko Chung
Anne Heung as Sabrina Kwai 
Paul Chun as Ting Wing-pong
Gigi Wong as Ebel Ting
Felix Lok as Ting Wing-tung
Kwok Fung Law Kai-cheung
Shek Sau as Jonathan Hung

Additional cast
Benz Hui as Henry Kam
Wilson Tsui as Jack Chiu
Lau Dan as Chung Wai-kuk
Lau Kong as Ching Choi-san
Patricia Liu as Moon
Ron Ng as Kwan Siu-chau
Carlo Ng as Sunny Leung
Power Chan as Szeto Kai

Cameos
Bernice Liu as Alice Yiu
Law Lok-lam as Howard Yiu
Leila Tong
Kenneth Ma as Doctor
Gregory Charles Rivers as Jewelry Design Instructor

Awards and nominations

References

TVB dramas
2002 Hong Kong television series debuts
2002 Hong Kong television series endings
Serial drama television series
2000s Hong Kong television series
Financial thrillers
Cantonese-language television shows
Television shows set in Hong Kong
Television shows set in Australia